Lieutenant General Shahnawaz Tanai (Russian: Шахнаваз Танай, 1950 – 7 March 2022) was an Afghan politician and general officer who served as the Chief of General Staff of the Afghan National Army until his defection to neighbouring Pakistan following a failed coup d'état in 1990.

Besides commanding the Afghan National Army during the Soviet-Afghan War, his command assignments included the command of the artillery and director of military intelligence as well as serving as minister of defense under President Mohammad Najibullah. He was a hardline member of the Khalq faction of the People's Democratic Party of Afghanistan, and leader of at least the majority of the Khalqist faction since its former leader Sayed Mohammad Gulabzoy was exiled as Ambassador to the Soviet Union as part of the political preparation of the Soviet pullout from Afghanistan in September 1988. A pillar of the communist regime, Tanai later attempted a coup against his former friend and President Mohammad Najibullah, before seeking refuge in a hostile Pakistan and working with fundamentalists such as Gulbuddin Hekmatyar. He returned in 2005 and created a political party.

He has been described as a "nationalist radical" who, despite being fiercely pro-Soviet, still maintained secret contacts with certain mujahideen members.

Early years and army general
Tanai was born in the village, named Dargai (not to be confused with a town in Pakistan), located in the Khost in Afghanistan to a poor ethnic Pashtun family 
in 1950. He was educated in the Soviet Union where he first studied the infantry tactics and later excelling in leadership. He married in 1978.

After the 1978 coup in which President Mohammed Daoud Khan was ousted and killed, Tanai was appointed head of Military Intelligence. He survived through the years of bloodshed that followed during the Saur Revolution. His first appointment was of Commander of the Kabul garrison.

When Mohammad Hasan Sharq was selected by President Najibullah as the new Prime Minister, the position of Minister of Defense remained open for some time, but was finally awarded to General Tanai. Tanai himself was recognized as a hawk and a sworn enemy of the Mujahideen. He even urged targeting SCUD missiles at Islamabad. He sought a military solution to the conflict, as opposed to the party's policy (under Najibullah) of national reconciliation.

Coup of March 1990 

On 6 March 1990, when the trial of the Khalqi officers was about to start, Tanai launched a coup with the help of renegade mujahideen commander, Gulbuddin Hekmatyar, against the then President Mohammad Najibullah. Tanai had secret sporadic contacts with the hardline Islamist Hekmatyar. The Pakistan government's involvement in this abortive affair was transparently obvious. Prime Minister Benazir Bhutto's plea to the other six party leaders to aid Tanai and Hekmatyar was rebuked as a disgrace to the jihad. Most of the factions viewed General Tanai as an opportunistic war criminal and hardline communist who had been responsible for the carpet-bombing of portions of the major western city of Herat in March 1979.

The expected uprising by the Afghan Army did not take place: Tanai had no direct control of troops inside Kabul. President Najibullah appeared on television at 10 p.m. the same night to prove that he was physically there and in effective control of the state apparatus. Tanai escaped by helicopter to Peshawar, Pakistan, where he was greeted and publicly accepted as an ally by Hekmatyar. Eventually, he settled there in Pakistan, where he lived in exile until 4 August.

Post-1990 
Later it was alleged, but never proven, that Tanai had assisted the Taliban. Instead, Pakistan's army had transferred support from Tanai to the Taliban, since Tanai was seen as carrying too much baggage from his former years and the Taliban leadership and ranks were made up largely of mujahidin fighters. Nonetheless, the Northern Alliance trumpeted the claim that Tanai had supported the Taliban, although this was quite easily disproven, and their own ranks included former communist leaders like Abdul Rashid Dostum.

Tanai was latterly the leader of the Afghanistan Peace Movement (De Afghanistan De Solay Ghorzang Gond) party. In 2005, he returned to Khost province to make a political comeback. He drove from Islamabad to the border town of Torkham, where he crossed over to Afghanistan to be warmly received by his supporters. He was then escorted in a convoy of vehicles to Kabul, where he resided. He did not stand as a presidential candidate in the 2004 elections, but his movement was enrolled as the 29th political party for the 2004 elections, and it was expected that his influence would bring back Afghan communists from Pakistan and elsewhere where they fled to play a political role.

He also campaigned for a bigger role for Pashtuns, former jihadi leaders and religious parties, and he openly criticised United States policies that perpetuate the Northern Alliance domination in Kabul.

There were allegations that Tanai had been sent by Pakistan to influence Afghanistan's politics in the post-Taliban period. He was also accused of working for Pakistan's Inter Services Intelligence (ISI). According to western diplomatic sources, Tanai acted as an agent for ISI by providing the Taliban a skilled cadre of military officers from the Khalq faction of the People's Democratic Party of Afghanistan to use his pilots to fly Mig-23, Sukhoi fighters of what was left of the Afghan Air Force, drive Soviet tanks and the use of Soviet artillery. However, most neutral sources doubt this claim, partly because Western sources have tended to play up the ISI's role in the Pashtun discontent, and partly because of Tanai's unpopularity with Pakistan's army and intelligence—as opposed to the Pakistan Peoples Party in power when he fled to Pakistan.

In a 2009 interview, Tanai stated that the NATO troops are no different than Soviet troops and that they must leave Afghanistan.

Following the Taliban takeover of Kabul in 2021, Tanai was pictured in October 2021 in Kabul in meetings with both Gulbuddin Hekmatyar and former president Hamid Karzai.

On 7 March 2022, it was announced that Tanai had died at the age of 72 in an Islamabad hospital.

References

External links 
 Interview with Gral. Tanai
 Pakistani description of Tanai's Coup

1950 births
2022 deaths
Afghan military officers
Communist government ministers of Afghanistan
People from Khost Province
Afghan expatriates in Pakistan
Afghan expatriates in the Soviet Union
Defence ministers of Afghanistan